Michael Parks (born Harry Samuel Parks; April 24, 1940 – May 9, 2017) was an American singer and actor. He appeared in many films and made frequent television appearances, notably starring in the 1969–1970 series Then Came Bronson, but was probably best known for his work in his later years with filmmakers such as Quentin Tarantino, Robert Rodriguez, and Kevin Smith.

Personal life
Parks was born in Corona, California.

He drifted from job to job during his teenage years, including picking fruit, digging ditches, driving trucks, and fighting forest fires.

Parks married five times. His first marriage in 1956 at age 16 to Louise Johnson lasted until 1958 and produced a daughter. His second marriage in 1964 to actress Jan Moriarty lasted only a few months, ending with her apparent suicide from an overdose. His third marriage in 1968 to Carolyn Kay Carson produced a son, James. His fourth marriage to Alston Fenci, whom he married in 1987, ended in divorce in 1996. In 1997 he married Oriana. The union lasted until his death.

Career

In 1961, Parks portrayed the nephew of the character George MacMichael on the ABC sitcom The Real McCoys.  In a Wagon Train episode airing April 10, 1963, Parks was Hamish Browne, episode titled "The Heather and Hamish Story".  He appeared with Bette Davis as Cal Leonard in the 1963 Perry Mason episode "The Case of Constant Doyle", and gained recognition in the role of Adam in John Huston's The Bible: In the Beginning... (1966).

Parks was the star of the series Then Came Bronson from 1969 to 1970, in which he rode an iconic red Harley-Davidson Sportster, as he drifted from town to town. He sang "Wayfarin’ Stranger", a duet with pilot episode co-star Bonnie Bedelia, and later the theme song for the show, "Long Lonesome Highway", which became a No. 20 Billboard Hot 100 and No. 41 Hot Country Songs hit. "Long Lonesome Highway" also peaked at number 84 in Australia.

Parks recorded five albums under MGM Records (the label of the studio which produced the series) that charted including Closing The Gap (1969), Long Lonesome Highway (1970), and Blue.

After disputes with the producers of Bronson, Parks said he was informally blacklisted in Hollywood. Parks admitted he could be "difficult on the set" and also said he objected to producers wanting to make the series more violent. After the cancellation of Bronson, Parks didn't work in a major Hollywood production for several years, but he had regular small roles in independent or Canadian features throughout the 1970s, such as Between Friends (1973), although director Donald Shebib had trouble dealing with Parks, describing him as a "terrific actor in a lot of ways, but weird" while also accusing him of anti-Semitism. 

He played in twelve episodes of ABC's The Colbys, a spin-off from Dynasty, first as Hoyt Parker, and then Phillip Colby during the second season (1986–1987).  He appeared as Irish mob boss Tommy O'Shea in Death Wish V: The Face of Death (1994), French-Canadian drug runner Jean Renault in the ABC television series Twin Peaks, Dr. Banyard in Deceiver (1997), Texas Ranger Earl McGraw in From Dusk till Dawn (1996), and Ambrose Bierce in From Dusk Till Dawn 3: The Hangman's Daughter (2000).

Parks played two roles in the Kill Bill film series, reprising the role of Earl McGraw in the first film (2003) and playing pimp Esteban Vihaio in the second film (2004). He again reprised the role of Earl McGraw in both segments of the film Grindhouse (2007), making his fourth appearance as the Texas Ranger. His son, James Parks, played the son of Earl McGraw in Kill Bill, From Dusk Till Dawn 2: Texas Blood Money, Death Proof, and Planet Terror. Parks played a villain in Kevin Smith's horror films Red State (2011) and Tusk (2014).

Smith later announced on his podcast that Parks had recorded an album during Red State production, after Smith and producer Jon Gordon noticed his singing talent during filming. The album, titled The Red State Sessions, was released on August 15, 2011 as a download from the film's website.

Death and reaction
Parks died on May 9, 2017 in his Los Angeles home at the age of 77. He requested a full body burial at sea, which his wife attended alone following a public  funeral held at Westwood Village Memorial Park Cemetery.

Upon hearing the news, director Kevin Smith posted on his Instagram account "Michael was, and will likely forever remain, the best actor I've ever known. I wrote both Red State and Tusk for Parks, I loved his acting so much." He also included, "He was, hands-down, the most incredible thespian I ever had the pleasure to watch perform. And Parks brought out the absolute best in me every time he got near my set." In a Twitter post, director Robert Rodriguez referred to Michael Parks as "a true legend".

Documentary 
Kevin Smith is producing a documentary on the life and times of Michael Parks, directed by Michael's former assistant, Josh Roush. Long Lonesome Highway covers his beginnings as an itinerant farmer where he hopped boxcars at age 12, through being blacklisted in Hollywood, to his career resurgence at the hands of filmmakers such as Quentin Tarantino. It stars James Parks, Kurt Russell, Haley Joel Osment, Robert Rodriguez, Leonard Maltin, Mickey Rourke, Justin Long, Wyatt Russell, Mark Frost, and more.

Filmography

Film

Television

Discography

ALBUMS:
 1969 – Closing The Gap (MGM)
 1970 – Long Lonesome Highway (MGM)
 1970 – Blue (MGM)
 1970 – Lost & Found  (Verve)
 1971 – Best Of Michael Parks (MGM)
 1981 – You Don't Know Me  (First American)
 1998 – Coolin' Soup (Listen)
 2011 – The Red State Sessions (SModcast)

SINGLES: 
 1969 - Tie Me To Your Apron Strings Again / Won't You Ride in My Little Red Wagon (MGM K14092) #117 Billboard's Bubbling Under chart
 1970 - Long Lonesome Highway / Mountain High (MGM K14104) #20 Billboard's Hot 100 chart
 1970 - Sally (Was A Gentle Woman) / Spend A Little, Save A Little (Give A Little Away) (MGM K14154)
 1970 - Big "T" Water / Won't You Ride in My Little Red Wagon (MGM K14363)
 1970 - I Was Born In Kentucky / Turn Around Little Mama (Verve VK10653)

References

External links
 
 
 
 Michael Parks sings Long Lonesome Highway

1940 births
2017 deaths
American male film actors
American male television actors
20th-century American male actors
Male actors from California
American male singers
People from Corona, California
21st-century American male actors